Jefferson Hall was an apartment building located in Detroit, Michigan. It was listed on the National Register of Historic Places in 1985, but subsequently demolished.

History

Jefferson Hall was constructed in 1916. It operated as an apartment through the 1980s, but was demolished in about 1990.

Description
Jefferson Hall was a four-story red brick apartment building built in the "garden court" style, where apartments are arranged in a U-shape around a central courtyard. This arrangement gave tenants more window space and a courtyard view. The building was trimmed with stone. The main lobby was located in the center of the U, and two commercial stores flanked the entryway. Projecting bay windows were located above, on the second through fourth floors.

References

National Register of Historic Places in Detroit
Demolished buildings and structures in Detroit
Buildings and structures completed in 1916